Train to Busan is a 2016 South Korean action horror film directed by Yeon Sang-ho and starring Gong Yoo, Jung Yu-mi, Ma Dong-seok, Kim Su-an, Choi Woo-shik, Ahn So-hee, and Kim Eui-sung. The film mostly takes place on a high-speed train from Seoul to Busan as a zombie apocalypse suddenly breaks out in the country and threatens the safety of the passengers.

The film premiered in the Midnight Screenings section of the 2016 Cannes Film Festival on 13 May. On 7 August, the film set a record as the first Korean film of 2016 to break the audience record of over 10 million theatergoers. 

The movie successfully launched a titular film series; with an animated prequel film in 2016, and a standalone sequel in 2020. Another installment, as well as an American produced adaptation are also in development.

Plot

Fund manager Seok-woo is a cynical workaholic and divorced father of his daughter Su-an, who wants to spend her birthday with her mother in Busan. Seok-woo sees a video of Su-an attempting to sing "Aloha ʻOe" at her singing recital and succumbing to stage fright as a result of his absence. Overcome with guilt, he decides to grant Su-an's birthday wish. The next day, they board the KTX 101 at Seoul Station, en route to Busan. Other passengers include Sang-hwa and his pregnant wife Seong-kyeong, COO Yon-suk, a high school baseball team including player Yong-guk and his cheerleader girlfriend Jin-hee, elderly sisters In-gil and Jong-gil, train attendant Ki-chul, and a traumatized homeless stowaway hiding in the bathroom. As the train departs, an ill young woman runs onto the train unnoticed. She turns into a zombie and attacks a train attendant, who also turns. The infection spreads rapidly throughout the train.

The group escapes to another car and locks the doors. Internet reports and phone calls make it known that an epidemic is spreading southward across the country. After the train stops at Daejeon Station, the surviving passengers find the city overrun by zombies and hastily retreat back to the train, splitting up into different train cars in the ensuing chaos. Seok-woo learns by phone that his company is indirectly involved in the disaster. The military establishes a quarantine zone near Busan, to which the engineer sets a course. Seok-woo, Sang-hwa and Yong-guk – who have become separated from their loved ones – fight their way to where Su-an and Seong-kyeong are hiding with In-gil and the homeless man. Once regrouped, they struggle through the zombie horde to the front train car, where the rest of the passengers are sheltered. At the prompting of Yon-suk and Ki-chul, the passengers prevent the survivors from entering, fearing that they are infected. Sang-hwa sacrifices himself to give the others time to force open the door and enter the car, but In-gil is killed. Yon-suk and the passengers demand that the survivors isolate themselves in the front vestibule. However, Jong-gil – disgusted at the passengers and despairing for the loss of her sister – deliberately opens the other door and allows the zombies to enter and kill the rest of the car's passengers. Yon-suk and Ki-chul escape by hiding in the bathroom.

A blocked track at the East Daegu train station forces the survivors to stop and search for another train. Yon-suk escapes after pushing Ki-chul into the zombies, then later does the same with Jin-hee when they run into each other. Heartbroken, Yong-guk stays with Jin-hee until she turns and kills him. The train conductor starts a locomotive on another track, but is also thrown to the zombies while trying to save an injured Yon-suk. A flaming locomotive derails and traps the remaining survivors, but Seok-woo finds a way out. The rest of the group is trapped again by falling debris. The homeless man sacrifices himself to buy time for Seok-woo to clear the debris and Su-an and Seong-kyeong to escape onto the new locomotive. After fighting off zombies hanging onto the locomotive, they encounter Yon-suk, who is on the verge of turning into a zombie and is begging for help. Seok-woo manages to throw him off, but is bitten. He puts Su-an and Seong-kyeong inside the engine room, teaches Seong-kyeong how to operate the train, and says goodbye to his daughter before throwing himself off the locomotive.

Due to another train blockage, Su-an and Seong-kyeong are forced to stop the train at a tunnel just prior to Busan. The two exit the train and continue following the tracks on foot through the tunnel. Snipers are stationed on the other side of the tunnel and are prepared to shoot at what they believe to be zombies, but they lower their weapons and rush towards them to help them when they hear Su-an singing "Aloha ʻOe".

Cast 

 Gong Yoo as Seok-woo, a fund manager whose wife left him because of his selfishness.
 Jung Yu-mi as Seong-kyeong, Sang-hwa's pregnant wife
 Ma Dong-seok as Yoon Sang-hwa, husband of Seong-kyeong
 Kim Su-an as Su-an, daughter of Seok-woo who wants to see her mom in Busan for her birthday.
 Choi Woo-shik as Min Yong-guk, a high school baseball player
 Sohee as Kim Jin-hee, Yong-guk's girlfriend
 Kim Eui-sung as Yon-suk, a business executive
 Choi Gwi-hwa as a homeless man
 Jang Hyuk-jin as Ki-chul, a train attendant
 Park Myung-sin as Jong-gil, In-gil's younger sister
 Ye Soo-jung as In-gil, the older sister of Jong-gil
 Jeong Seok-yong as the captain of the KTX
 Han Seong-soo as the KTX train Team Leader
 Kim Chang-hwan as Deputy Kim Jin-mo
 Shim Eun-kyung as a runaway girl
 Lee Joo-shil as Seok-woo's mother and Su-an's grandmother

Production
The film team tried to reference the movements of the zombies in the game 7 Days to Die and the movements of the dolls from Ghost in the Shell, and also reviewed the movements from the nurses in Silent Hill. The film was filmed in various stations from Daejeon, Cheonan and East Daegu. The water deer in the movie was created using real videos of water deer and 3D modelling. The scenery that is seen outside the train in the film was shot with an LED plate rear screen technique behind the set and by focusing on the characters. The blood vessels of the zombies were drawn with an airbrush. The zombies were styled differently depending on the progress of the infection of zombies.

Reception

Box office
Train to Busan grossed $80.5 million in South Korea, $2.2 million in the United States and Canada, and $15.8 million in other territories, for a total worldwide gross of $98.5 million.

It became the highest-grossing Korean film in Malaysia, Hong Kong, and Singapore. In South Korea, it recorded more than 11 million moviegoers and was the highest grossing film of the year.

Critical response
The review aggregator Rotten Tomatoes reported that 94% of 118 critics have given the film a positive review, with an average rating of 7.60/10. The website's critics consensus states: "Train to Busan delivers a thrillingly unique — and purely entertaining — take on the zombie genre, with fully realized characters and plenty of social commentary to underscore the bursts of skillfully staged action." Metacritic, which assigns a normalized rating to reviews, assigned the film an average score of 72 out of 100, based on 16 critics, indicating "generally favorable reviews."

Clark Collis of Entertainment Weekly wrote that the film "borrows heavily from World War Z in its depiction of the fast-moving undead masses while also boasting an emotional core the Brad Pitt-starring extravaganza often lacked," adding that "the result is first-class throughout." At The New York Times, Jeannette Catsoulis selected the film as her "Critic's Pick" and took notice of its subtle class warfare.

In a negative review, David Ehrlich of IndieWire comments that "as the characters whittle away into archetypes (and start making senseless decisions), the spectacle also sheds its unique personality." Kevin Jagernauth of The Playlist wrote: "[Train to Busan] doesn’t add anything significant to the zombie genre, nor has anything perceptive to say about humanity in the face of crisis. Sure, it lacks brains, and that’s the easy quip to make, but what Train To Busan truly needs, and disappointingly lacks, is heart."

British filmmaker Edgar Wright highly applauded the film, personally recommending it on Twitter and calling it the "best zombie movie I've seen in forever."

Accolades

Home media
American distributor Well Go USA released DVD and Blu-ray versions of Train to Busan on 17 January 2017. FNC Add Culture released the Korean DVD and Blu-ray versions on 22 February 2017. It is also available on Rakuten Viki, Netflix, and Amazon Prime Video streaming. The Indian version is a minute shorter than the original version due to a few violent zombie shots being censored.

In the United Kingdom, it was 2017's fourth best-selling foreign language film on home video (below Operation Chromite, Your Name, and Guardians). It was later 2020's sixth best-selling foreign language film in the UK, and third best-selling Korean film (below Parasite and Train to Busan Presents: Peninsula).

Followups

Prequel

An animated prequel, Seoul Station, also directed by Yeon, was released on 18 August 2016.

Sequel

Peninsula, a standalone sequel set four years after Train to Busan and also directed by Yeon, was released in South Korea on 15 July  2020, it gained mixed reviews. Yeon has stated that,

American remake
In 2016, Gaumont acquired the rights for the English-language remake of the film from Next Entertainment World. In 2018, New Line Cinema, Atomic Monster and Coin Operated were announced to be the co-producing partners for the remake, with Warner Bros. Pictures distributing worldwide, except for France and South Korea. Indonesian director Timo Tjahjanto is in talks to helm the film, while Gary Dauberman adapts the screenplay and co-produces the film alongside James Wan. In December 2021, the film's official title was revealed to be The Last Train to New York scheduled to be released April 21, 2023. However, in July 2022, Warner Bros. removed the film off the release schedule with Evil Dead Rise, another New Line Cinema film, taking its original release date.

References

External links
 
 
 
 
 
 

2016 films
2016 action thriller films
2016 horror thriller films
2010s action horror films
Apocalyptic films
Films about families
Films directed by Yeon Sang-ho
Films set in Seoul
Films set in South Chungcheong Province
Films set in Daejeon
Films set in Daegu
Films set on trains
Korea Train Express
2010s Korean-language films
Next Entertainment World films
South Korean action thriller films
South Korean action horror films
South Korean horror thriller films
South Korean zombie films
Films about viral outbreaks
South Korean science fiction horror films
South Korean science fiction action films
Films about father–daughter relationships
2010s South Korean films